Nemoria bifilata, the white-barred emerald moth, is a moth in the family Geometridae. The species was first described by Francis Walker in 1863. It is found in North America.

The MONA or Hodges number for Nemoria bifilata is 7045.

Subspecies
Two subspecies belong to Nemoria bifilata:
 Nemoria bifilata bifilata (Walker, 1863) g b
 Nemoria bifilata planuscula Ferguson, 1969 c g b
Data sources: i = ITIS, c = Catalogue of Life, g = GBIF, b = BugGuide

References

Further reading

External links

 

Geometrinae
Articles created by Qbugbot
Moths described in 1863